The Dade County School District is a public school district in Dade County, Georgia, United States, based in Trenton. It serves the communities of Trenton, Rising Fawn, and Wildwood.

Schools
The Dade County School District has two elementary schools, one middle school, and one high school, all but one of which are located in downtown Trenton, Georgia in the valley, with Davis Elementary being located on Sand Mountain.

Elementary schools
Dade Elementary School
Davis Elementary School

Middle school
Dade Middle School

High school
Dade County High School

References

External links

School districts in Georgia (U.S. state)
Education in Dade County, Georgia